The Directorate for Investigating Organized Crime and Terrorism (DIICOT) is a law enforcement agency of the Romanian government tasked with investigating and prosecuting organized crime, drug trafficking, cybercrime, financial crimes, and terrorism-related offenses.

The DIICOT is headed by a Chief Prosecutor and a deputy, nominated by the Minister of Justice and appointed by the President of Romania. The Chief Prosecutor of the Directorate is subordinated to the General Prosecutor of the Prosecutor's Office attached to the High Court of Cassation and Justice.

Considered to be smaller and lesser known than its sister agency, the National Anticorruption Directorate, the DIICOT has wider ranging responsibilities that include crimes against cultural heritage, tobacco smuggling, and migrant trafficking. In 2017 alone, over 3,200 people were convicted based on its investigations and indictments.

History 
After the resignation of former DIICOT chief prosecutor Giorgiana Hosu, the agency's top role was filled by her deputy, Oana Pâțu, in an acting position. On December 28, 2022, DIICOT announced that her permanent replacement will be selected by March 1, 2023.

See also 
 Crime in Romania
 Kidnapping of Alexandra Măceșanu and Luiza Melencu
 Andrew Tate

References

Bibliography 

 
 

2003 establishments in Romania
National security of Romania